Fisher Lake may refer to:

 Many lakes in Ontario - see List of lakes of Ontario: F#Fi
 Fisher Lake (Michigan), Gogebic County, Michigan
 Fisher Lake (Minnesota), Scott County, Minnesota
 O.C. Fisher Lake, San Angelo, Texas

See also 
 Fishers Lake (Arkansas), Ouachita County, Arkansas
 Fishers Lake (Michigan), St Joseph County, Michigan
 Fischer Lake, Orlando, Florida